Holcosus festivus, commonly known as the Central American whiptail, the Middle American ameiva, and the tiger ameiva, is a species of lizard in the family Teiidae. The species is native to Central America and northern South America.

Geographic range
H. festivus is found from southern Mexico to Colombia.

Description
H. festivus is brown-colored, with darker browns making a zig-zag pattern down the back. A similar species is Holcosus quadrilineatus. Juveniles have metallic-blue tails.

Habitat
H. festivus lives in open habitats.

Subspecies
Three subspecies are recognized, including the nominotypical subspecies.
H. f.  festivus  – northern Colombia and Panama
H. f.   edwardsii  – Guatemala, Honduras, southern Mexico, and Nicaragua
H. f.   occidentalis  – Costa Rica

Nota bene: A taxon author (binomial authority or trinomial authority) in parentheses indicates that the taxon (species or subspecies) was originally described in a different genus (in this case, a genus other than Holcosus).

Etymology
The subspecific name, edwardsii, is in honor of French zoologist Alphonse Milne-Edwards.

References

Further reading
Boulenger GA (1885). Catalogue of the Lizards in the British Museum (Natural History). Second Edition. Volume II ... Teiidæ ... London: Trustees of the British Museum (Natural History). (Taylor and Francis, printers). xiii + 497 pp. + Plates I-XXIV. (Ameiva festiva, p. 347).
Lichtenstein H (1856). Nomenclator reptilium et amphibiorum musei zoologici Berolinensis: Namenverzeichniss der in der zoologischen Sammlung der Königlichen Universität zu Berlin aufgestellten Arten von Reptilien und Amphibien nach ihren Ordnungen, Familien und Gattungen. Berlin: Königlichen Akademie der Wissenschaften. iv + 48 pp. (Cnemidophorus festivus, new species, p. 13). (in Latin and German).

External links
Ameiva festiva, Jan Ševčík.
Central American Whiptailed Lizard, NaturePhotos-CZ.com.
Ameiva festiva, WildHerps.com.

festivus
Reptiles of Mexico
Reptiles of Central America
Reptiles of Colombia
Reptiles described in 1856
Taxa named by Hinrich Lichtenstein